This article lists the fastest record serve speeds for men's and women's professional tennis. Max reported speeds are dubious due to the occasional errors with ATP radar equipment.

This list is not historically complete. For instance, not listed here, Roscoe Tanner's serve was clocked at 153 mph at Palm Springs in 1978 during the final against Raúl Ramírez. There are also reports that Bill Tilden had a serve that was clocked at 163.3 mph but there is nothing to verify that. Also, Ellsworth Vines in the Wimbledon finals of 1932 clocked 121 mph (without Radar). Udayachand Shetty's winning serve was clocked by radar at 120 mph using a wooden racquet, at the Gilbey Gins fast serve contest held in Chicago on 24 July 1976. This qualified him to take part in the finals at the West Side Tennis Club in Forest Hills Queens on 20 August 1976.
Colin Dibley of Australia won the event with a serve of 130 mph.

Currently, the Association of Tennis Professionals (ATP) does not formally recognize service speed records made in Challenger tour events due to lack of uniformity in these tournaments' radar guns (including availability or lack thereof). Nevertheless, the serve speed of  recorded by Australian Sam Groth at an ATP Challenger event in Busan, South Korea in May 2012 was measured using ATP-approved equipment and other data gathered appeared within a normal range. Groth has more serves over 145 mph, having serves recorded at 146-147 mph at least 5 times at Grand Slam tournaments.

Reilly Opelka with a  second serve in the quarterfinals of the 2021 Italian Open in Rome, holds the record for the fastest second serve ever recorded.

Multiple suspected errors in speed gun readings have been observed on ATP equipment.

 Criteria to be listed in this article
 Men's serves must be recorded at or over  minimum standard speed.
 Women's serves must be recorded at or over  minimum standard speed.
 Only one serve per player is recorded here.
 In cases where more than one serve has been recorded at the same speed, the oldest recorded serve is listed first.

Men

Women 

The WTA doesn't keep official serve speed rankings of its own for all its events for a variety of reasons—mainly that serve speed isn't captured on every court at every tournament, and sometimes the technology being used isn't consistent from event to event. The Women's Tennis Association does have an external partner that it officially recognizes which measures and maintains serve speed data at selected number of events. It does not recognize at all, nor keep tabs of speed records set outside the main draw phase of WTA Tour tournaments. Therefore, serve speeds recorded from the qualifying phase of WTA tournaments are not added to the official WTA serve speed statistics. Also WTA tournament serve speeds recorded by different measurement systems or brands (at the discretion of the host or organizer) that are not using technology provided by ATP/WTA's official supplier or partner (currently SMT/IDS), or speeds recorded at any of the non-WTA professional women's tournaments such as the ITF Women's Circuit, the Fed Cup, and Olympics tennis are not added to WTA's official list of records.

See also 

 Ace (tennis)

References 

Tennis records and statistics